Hayhoe is a surname. Notable people with the surname include:

Barney Hayhoe, Baron Hayhoe (1925-2013), British politician
Bill Hayhoe (born 1946), American football player
Brock Hayhoe (born 1986), Canadian ballet dancer and drag queen
Katharine Hayhoe (born 1972), American atmospheric scientist
Simon Hayhoe (born 1969), British educationist
Tom Hayhoe (born 1956), English official
George Hayhoe, engineer at Mercer University
Alfred Hayhoe, British racehorse trainer